The Second Cabinet of Kaj Leo Johannesen was the government of the Faroe Islands from 14 November 2011 until 15 September 2015 with Kaj Leo Johannesen from Union Party (Sambandsflokkurin) as Prime Minister, making a coalition between Union Party (Sambandsflokkurin), People's Party (Fólkaflokkurin), Self-Government Party (Sjálvstýrisflokkurin) and Centre Party (Miðflokkurin). It is a majority government and the first completely right winged government on the islands since 1985. In September 2013 the Self Governing Party left the coalition and the ministry was closed, after their minister Kári P. Højgaard had been sacked after much discussion about a subsea tunnel between the two largest islands: Streymoy and Eysturoy, Eysturoyartunnilin, which Mr. Højgaard planned to let a private Danish company called Copenhagen Infrastructure Partners make. The plans about making the tunnel were aborted, but in February 2014 all political parties of the Løgting including the independent excluded former member of the Social Democratic Party (Javnaðarflokkurin), Gerhard Lognberg, agreed on making two subseatunnels: Eysturoyartunnilin and Sandoyartunnilin, both are planned to open in 2021 if everything works out as the politicians have planned, and they will be made by the Faroese government.

See also 
 Cabinet of the Faroe Islands
 List of members of the Løgting, 2011–15

References 

Cabinets of the Faroe Islands
2011 in the Faroe Islands
2012 in the Faroe Islands
2013 in the Faroe Islands